Marjorie Hume (27 January 1893 – 13 March 1976) was an English film actress. She appeared in 36 films between 1917 and 1955.

Selected filmography

 Doing His Bit (1917)
 Red Pottage (1918)
 The Swindler (1918)
 Lady Tetley's Decree (1920)
 The Scarlet Kiss (1920)
 Appearances (1921)
 The Great Day (1921)
 The Call of Youth (1921)
 Silent Evidence (1922)
 M'Lord of the White Road (1923)
 The Two Boys (1924)
 King of the Castle (1925)
 Thou Fool (1926)
 The Island of Despair (1926)
 One Colombo Night (1926)
 Young Woodley (1928)
 Up to the Neck (1933)
 A Royal Demand (1933)
 The White Lilac (1935)
 Cross Currents (1935)
 Member of the Jury (1937)
 The Limping Man (1953)
 Children Galore (1955)

External links

1893 births
1976 deaths
English film actresses
English silent film actresses
People from Great Yarmouth
Actors from Norfolk
20th-century English actresses
People from Oxshott